Romance (from Vulgar Latin , "in the Roman language", i.e., "Latin") may refer to:

Common meanings
 Romance (love), emotional attraction towards another person and the courtship behaviors undertaken to express the feelings
 Romance languages, a subgroup of the Italic languages
 Romance studies, an academic discipline studying the languages, literatures, and cultures of areas that speak a Romance language

Places
 Romance, Arkansas, U.S.
 Romance, Missouri, U.S.
 Romance, West Virginia U.S.
 Romance, Wisconsin, U.S.

Arts, entertainment, and media

Film
 Romance film, a genre of film of which the central plot focuses on the romantic relationships of the protagonists
 Romantic comedy
 Romantic thriller
 Romance (1920 film), silent film, directed by Chester Withey
 Romance (1930 film), starring Greta Garbo
 Romance (1936 film), an Austrian film starring Carl Esmond
 Romance (1983 film), a Bollywood film produced and directed by Ramanand Sagar
 Romance (1986 film)
 Romance (1999 film), directed by Catherine Breillat
 Romance (2011 film)
 Romance (2013 film)

Literature

Literary genres
 Adventure tales
 Gaslight romance, another name for gaslamp fantasy, featuring fantasy set at a time of approximately 19th-century technology
 Planetary romance, a genre of science fiction consisting of adventure tales on exotic planets
 Ruritanian romance, a genre of swashbuckling adventure novels, set in a fictional country, usually in Central or Eastern Europe
 Scientific romance, an archaic term for the genre of fiction now commonly known as science fiction
 Chivalric romance literature, a branch of medieval and medievalist literature
 Literature of Romanticism, a movement from the late 18th century that broke away from neoclassicism and which emphasized nature, the imagination and emotions
 Hellenistic romance, or Ancient Greek romance, a modern term for the genre of the five surviving Ancient Greek novels
 Romance (prose fiction), a type of novel, especially, but not necessarily, an historical novel, and distinct from genre fiction love romances
 Romance literature (disambiguation)
 Romance novel, a genre of novel which emerged in the 20th century, directed at women readers, that focuses on romantic love, with many sub-genres:
 Amish romance, also known as "bonnet rippers"
 Contemporary romance
 Historical romance, a 20th-century genre fiction version of the historical novel
 Paranormal romance
 Regency romance
 Fantasy romance

Works
 Romance (novel), a 1905 novel by Joseph Conrad
 Romance (play), a 2005 play by David Mamet
 "Romance" (poem), an 1829 poem by Edgar Allan Poe
 Romance (Sheldon play), a 1913 play by Edward Sheldon
 Shakespeare's late romances, or tragicomedies

Music

Albums
 Romance (Camila Cabello album), 2019
 Romance (David Cassidy album), 1985
 Romance (Luis Miguel album), 1991
 Romance (Ali Project album), 2006
 Romance (Dave Palmer album), 2006
 Romance (Frank Sinatra album), 2004
 Romance (Tubelord album), 2011
 Romances (Kaada/Patton album), 2004
 Romances (Luis Miguel album), 1997
 Romance (Dorso album), 1991
 Romance (Oneida album), 2018

Songs
 "Romance" (guitar piece), also known as "Romance Anónimo", a Spanish instrumental guitar piece of anonymous origin
 "Romance", by Claude Debussy
 "Romance", by Gordon Lightfoot from his 1983 album Salute
 "Romance", by Mike Oldfield from his album Light + Shade
 "Romance", the second movement of the suite Lieutenant Kijé (Op. 60) by Sergei Prokofiev
 "Romance", by R.E.M., originally released on the soundtrack of the 1987 film Made in Heaven
 "Romance", from the musical The Desert Song
 Romance in C major, Op. 48, for violin and orchestra by Camille Saint-Saëns
 Violin Romance No. 1 (Beethoven) in G major, Op. 40
 Violin Romance No. 2 (Beethoven) in F major, Op. 50
 "Romance" by Marc Ribot from his 1994 album Shrek
 "Romance" (Buck-Tick song), 2005 single by Buck-Tick
 "Romance" (Yoasobi song), 2021 single by Yoasobi

Other uses in music
 Romance (music), a type of ballad or lyrical song
 Romance (meter), a metric pattern found in Spanish ballads
 Romancero, the corpus of such Spanish ballads, or a collection of them
 Russian romance or Russian Gypsy song, a type of sentimental art song with hints of Gypsy influence that was developed in Imperial Russia
 Scandinavian romanser, classical art songs, equivalent to the German Lied
 Romance (band), rock band from London
 Romance Tour (disambiguation)

Television
 Romance (American TV series), 1949 American anthology series
 Romance (South Korean TV series), 2002 South Korean television drama series

See also
 A Fine Romance (disambiguation)
 A Romance (disambiguation)
 Romantic (disambiguation)
 Romanticism